Joseph Martin Sartoris (born July 1, 1927) is an American prelate of the Roman Catholic Church. Sartoris served as an auxiliary bishop of the Archdiocese of Los Angeles in California from 1994 to 2002.

Biography

Early life 
Joseph Sartoris was born in Los Angeles, California on July 1, 1927. He studied at St. John's Seminary in Camarillo, California.

Priesthood 
On May 30, 1953, Sartoris was ordained into the priesthood by Cardinal James McIntyre for the Archdiocese of Los Angeles. After his ordination, Sartoris was assigned as an associate pastor to several parishes. He then served as a teacher and assistant principal at Bishop Conaty High School in Los Angeles for several years. Sartoris then returned to parish ministry while also serving as administrator pro tempore at Dolores Mission Parish and administrator at Nativity Parish, both in Los Angeles. 

Sartoris' first assignment as pastor was at St. Madeleine Parish in Pomona, California. In 1978, Sartoris was named pastor of St. Margaret Mary Parish in Lomita, California.  He remained at St. Margaret as pastor until his appointment as bishop.

Auxiliary Bishop of Los Angeles 
On February 8, 1994, Pope John Paul II appointed Sartoris as the titular bishop of Oliva and as an auxiliary bishop of Los Angeles. He was consecrated a bishop by Cardinal Roger Mahony on May 19, 1994. Sartoris led the archdiocese's San Pedro Pastoral Region from 1994 to 2002. On December 31, 2002, John Paul II accepted Sartoris' letter of resignation; he had reached the mandatory retirement age of 75.

See also

 Catholic Church hierarchy
 Catholic Church in the United States
 Historical list of the Catholic bishops of the United States
 List of Catholic bishops of the United States
 Lists of patriarchs, archbishops, and bishops

References

External links
 Roman Catholic Archdiocese of Los Angeles
Auxiliary Bishops Archdiocese of Los Angeles Retrieved: 2010-05-03.
 United States Conference of Catholic Bishops News Release

Episcopal succession

 

1927 births
Living people
Clergy from Los Angeles
20th-century Roman Catholic bishops in the United States
St. John's Seminary (California) alumni
Catholics from California
21st-century Roman Catholic bishops in the United States